Spoil or spoils:
Plunder taken from an enemy or victim
Material (such as rock, earth or other overburden) removed during:
excavation
mining
dredging
An Australian rules football tactic, see One percenter (Australian rules football)#Spoil

See also
Spoil tip
Spoilage (disambiguation)
Spoiler (disambiguation)
Spolia (disambiguation)